Karl Friedrich Adolf Boser (1811, at Halbau in Prussian Silesia – 1881 at Düsseldorf), was a German artist. He studied in Dresden, Berlin, and Düsseldorf; his paintings, chiefly genre subjects and portraits, were popular. He is associated with the Düsseldorf school of painting.

Gallery

See also
 List of German painters

References

 

19th-century German painters
19th-century German male artists
German male painters
1811 births
1881 deaths
People from the Province of Silesia
Düsseldorf school of painting